Events from the year 1821 in Scotland.

Incumbents

Law officers 
 Lord Advocate – Sir William Rae, Bt
 Solicitor General for Scotland – James Wedderburn

Judiciary 
 Lord President of the Court of Session – Lord Granton
 Lord Justice General – The Duke of Montrose
 Lord Justice Clerk – Lord Boyle

Events 
 15 January – Sumburgh Head Lighthouse in Shetland, designed by Robert Stevenson, is first illuminated.
 28 April – foundation stone for the Melville Monument in St Andrew Square, Edinburgh, is laid.
 18 July – thief David Haggart is hanged in Edinburgh, aged 20, for the murder of a Dumfries tolbooth keeper in 1820, leaving an autobiography, The life of David Haggart, and phrenologist George Combe's Phrenological observations on the cerebral development of David Haggart.
 14 August – Trinity Chain Pier opens at Trinity, Edinburgh.
 16 October – the School of Arts of Edinburgh, a predecessor of Heriot-Watt University, is established by Leonard Horner for the education of working men.
 The Royal Scottish Society of Arts is founded as The Society for the Encouragement of the Useful Arts in Scotland by David Brewster.
 The publisher T&T Clark is established in Edinburgh by Thomas Clark.
 William Hooker (botanist) publishes Flora Scotica; or, A description of Scottish plants.
 Robert Owen's Report to the County of Lanark, of a plan for relieving public distress and removing discontent is published in Glasgow.

Births 
 10 March – Màiri Mhòr nan Òran, Gaelic poet (died 1898)
 15 March – William Milligan, theologian (died 1893)
 11 April – James Campbell Walker, architect (died 1888)
 26 April – Robert Adamson, pioneer photographer (died 1848)
 16 June – Old Tom Morris, golfer (died 1908)
 19 June – George Whyte-Melville, sporting novelist (died hunting 1878 in England)
 1 August – James Gowans, architect (died 1890)
 17 October – Alexander Gardner, photographer (died 1882 in the United States)
 13 December – Joseph Noel Paton, painter (died 1901)
 29 December – John Francis Campbell, Celtic folklorist and inventor (died 1885 in France)

Deaths 
 2 April – James Gregory, physician (born 1753)
 15 June – John Ballantyne, publisher (born 1774)
 4 October – John Rennie the Elder, civil engineer (born 1761; died in London)
 8 November – Charles Murray, actor (born 1754 in England)
 6 December – John Taylor, medical missionary (died in Persia)
 Isabel Pagan, poet (born c.1741)

The arts
 John Galt's novels Annals of the Parish and The Ayrshire Legatees are published.
 Jane Porter's novel The Scottish Chiefs is published.
 Sir Walter Scott's novel Kenilworth is published anonymously.

See also 

 1821 in the United Kingdom

References 

 
Scotland
1820s in Scotland